Karl Friedrich Ernst von Großheim (15 October 1841, Lübeck - 5 February 1911, Bad Rippoldsau) was a German architect and President of the Prussian Academy of Arts.

Life and work 

He began his education at the Großheimsche Realschule, founded by his grandfather, . After graduating, at the age of sixteen,  he went on to a three-year apprenticeship as a carpenter. He spent some of his journeyman years in Altona, then sought to continue his education at the Bauakademie in Berlin, with the goal of becoming an architect. For a time he worked with  Hermann von der Hude. At the academy, he made the acquaintance of his future partner, while both were attending a life drawing course taught by Carl Steffeck. He passed his state examination in 1860.

He and Kayser worked for August Orth from 1867 to 1870. The following year, they established their own firm; "Kayser und v. Großheim". They first attracted notice in 1872, when they came in second to Ludwig Bohnstedt in a competition to design the new Reichstag Building. The winning design was never used.

Their studio became one of the leading architectural firms of the period. Most of their work was in a Neo-Renaissance style. Although certain individual stylistic elements are detectable, they always took joint credit for their designs. Later, they created works  in the Neo-Baroque style. 

Numerous architects received training in their studios, including Martin Dülfer, who would become famous as a designer of theatres. Both were awarded the title of 
"Geheimrat" and received honorary professorships. In 1879, Großheim was one of the founding members of the Association of Berlin Architects. He became a member of the Arts Academy in 1880, and served as its President for a brief period from 1910 until his death.

His funeral was attended by the Minister of Culture, August von Trott zu Solz, representing Emperor Wilhelm II, who had ordered that the funeral procession be allowed to pass through the middle portal of the Brandenburg Gate; an honor that was usually reserved for princes and other members of the higher nobility. 

It included a fountain made of muschelkalk, and adorned with a portrait relief made by the sculptor, Ludwig Manzel.<ref>"Karl-v.-Grossheim-Brunnen in Lübeck". In: Zentralblatt der Bauverwaltung 1913, #65 pg.431 (online)</ref> During World War II, the lawn was converted to a pond. In 1990, the pond was removed and the fountain fully restored.

References

 Further reading 
 "Geheimer Baurat Prof. Carl von Groszheim", In: Lübeckische Anzeigen, 1910, #4
 "Carl von Großheim" (obituary), In: Vaterstädtische Blätter, 1911, #7
 Hubert Baumgärtel, "Großheim, Karl von", In: Allgemeines Lexikon der Bildenden Künstler von der Antike bis zur Gegenwart'', Vol. 15: Gresse–Hanselmann, E. A. Seemann, 1922 (online)

External links 

1841 births
1911 deaths
18th-century German architects
Academic staff of the Prussian Academy of Arts
Architects from Lübeck